The 2002–03 Louisville Cardinals men's basketball team represented the University of Louisville in the 2002–03 NCAA Division I men's basketball season. The head coach was Rick Pitino and the team finished the season with an overall record of 25–7.

Roster

Schedule and results

|-
!colspan=9 style=| Regular Season

|-
!colspan=9 style=| C-USA tournament

|-
!colspan=9 style=| NCAA tournament

Rankings

References 

Louisville Cardinals men's basketball seasons
Louisville
Louisville Cardinals men's basketball, 2002-03
Louisville Cardinals men's basketball, 2002-03